Moonlander is the second studio album by American musician Stone Gossard, best known as a member of Pearl Jam. The album was released on June 25, 2013, by Monkeywrench Records.

Track listing

References

2013 albums
Stone Gossard albums
Monkeywrench Records albums